Oak Street may refer to:
 Oak Street (Vancouver)
 Oak Street (Chicago)
 Oak Street (New Orleans)